= Capital of the Alps =

Capital of the Alps may refer to:

- Grenoble, a city of the Isère department, Auvergne-Rhône-Alpes, France
- Innsbruck, the capital of Tyrol, Austria
- Turin, the capital of Piedmont, Italy
